Robert Alexander Barry (August 7, 1860 - November 12, 1934) was an American politician and judge from Mississippi County, Missouri, who served in the Missouri House of Representatives. He died in 1934.

References

External links

1860 births
1934 deaths
Democratic Party members of the Missouri House of Representatives